Margit Saad (born 30 May 1929) is a German actress who has worked largely in German film and television, with occasional English language appearances.

Biography

She was born in Munich, Bavaria, the daughter of a Lebanese linguist father and a German language teaching mother from Düsseldorf. She made her screen debut in Eva erbt das Paradies. In 1960 she starred in the British drama film The Criminal and followed it up with appearances in other British films and television programmes such as The Rebel (US Call Me Genius, 1961) with Tony Hancock, Playback (1962), an entry in the Edgar Wallace Mysteries series of second features,  The Saint in The Saint Sees It Through (1964) and The Magnificent Two (1967) supporting Morecambe and Wise.

Saad appeared in an early 1966 episode of the American television espionage series Blue Light. It was edited together with three other episodes later in 1966 to create the American theatrical film I Deal in Danger, which includes her appearance.

Selected filmography

  Behind Monastery Walls (1952)
 Southern Nights (1953)
 The Gypsy Baron (1954)
 Marriage Sanitarium (1955)
 Three Girls from the Rhine (1955)
 Three Birch Trees on the Heath (1956)
 A Piece of Heaven (1957)
 Peter Voss, Thief of Millions (1958)
 Paradise for Sailors (1959)
 The Criminal (1960)
 The Rebel (1961)
 Playback (1962)
 I Deal in Danger (1966)
 The Magnificent Two (1967)
 The Last Escape (1970)

References

External links 

 

German film actresses
1929 births
Living people
German television actresses
Actresses from Munich
German people of Lebanese descent
20th-century German actresses